The Lake Lillian Neighborhood Historic District is a historic neighborhood located in Belleview, Florida. The district is bounded by Lillian Circle, Southeast Stetson Road, Southeast Mimosa Road, Southeast Earp Road and CSX RR tracks. On August 20, 1999, it was added to the National Register of Historic Places.

References

External links
 Marion County listings at National Register of Historic Places

National Register of Historic Places in Marion County, Florida
Historic districts on the National Register of Historic Places in Florida